CFNE-FM is a First Nations community radio station that broadcasts at 93.9 FM in Waswanipi, Quebec, Canada.

The station is owned by Waswanipi Communications Society. It's uncertain if the radio station is in operation.

References

External links
www.creeradio.com

Fne
Fne
Year of establishment missing